In geometry, the tangential angle of a curve in the Cartesian plane, at a specific point, is the angle between the tangent line to the curve at the given point and the -axis. (Some authors define the angle as the deviation from the direction of the curve at some fixed starting point. This is equivalent to the definition given here by the addition of a constant to the angle or by rotating the curve.)

Equations 

 

Thus, the tangential angle specifies the direction of the velocity vector , while the speed specifies its magnitude. The vector

If the curve is parametrized by arc length , so , then the definition simplifies to

Conversely, the tangent angle at a given point equals the definite integral of curvature up to that point:

This produces the explicit expression

Polar tangential angle 
In polar coordinates, the polar tangential angle is defined as the angle between the tangent line to the curve at the given point and ray from the origin to the point.

 .

.

The logarithmic spiral can be defined a curve whose polar tangential angle is constant.

See also 
 Differential geometry of curves
 Whewell equation
 Subtangent

References

Further reading 
 
 

Analytic geometry
Differential geometry